William Gowans (March 29, 1803 - November 27, 1870) was a prominent antiquarian bookseller in New York City. In 1821, he emigrated to the USA with his family. Around 1837, he stayed as a boarder in the house where Edgar Allen Poe also lived. He ran a bookstore for over 40 years, and for his last 10 years was the proprietor of a famously cluttered shop overflowing with volumes on Nassau Street in lower Manhattan.

References

Antiquarian booksellers
Scottish emigrants to the United States
1803 births
1870 deaths
American antiquarians
American booksellers
19th-century American businesspeople